Kalna parish is an administrative unit of Jēkabpils Municipality, Latvia.

Towns, villages and settlements of Kalna parish

References 

Parishes of Latvia
Jēkabpils Municipality